Syangela was a town of ancient Caria. It was a polis (city-state) and a member of the Delian League, appearing in tribute lists of ancient Athens. It, along with Myndus, avoided synoecism into Halicarnassus when Mausolus united other ancient cities into Halicarnassus.
 
Its site is located near Kaplan Dağ, Asiatic Turkey.

References

Populated places in ancient Caria
Former populated places in Turkey
Greek city-states
Members of the Delian League
Bodrum District
History of Muğla Province